West Pokot County is a county of Kenya. Its capital and largest town is Kapenguria. The county covers an area of approximately 9,169.4 square kilometers and stretches a distance of 132 kilometers from North to South. West Pokot County is bordered to the north by Turkana County, to the east by Baringo County, to the southeast by Elgeyo-Marakwet County, to the south by Trans Nzoia County and to the west by Uganda. According to the 2019 census, the county has a population of 621,241.  The county is home to Tegla Loroupe, one of the most famous Kenyan female runners.

Etymology

Demographics
Pokot people are the main inhabitants of the county and there is also a minority community of Sengwer.

Geography
Mount Mtelo is located in West Pokot County.

Constituencies 

 Kapenguria Constituency
 Kacheliba Constituency
 Pokot South Constituency
 Sigor Constituency

County subdivisions

The district has four constituencies: 
 Kacheliba Constituency 
 Kapenguria Constituency
 Sigor Constituency
 Pokot South Constituency

Economy
The West Pokot county economy is principally driven by agriculture and livestock rearing. Some of the main crops grown include maize, a staple ingredient grown mainly in West Pokot Sub-County, as well as finger millet, coffee, beans, onions, sweet potatoes, green grams, peas, mangoes, oranges, bananas, potatoes and pyrethrum.  The latter two are mainly grown in South Pokot sub-County.

In Pokot Central and North sub-counties, zebu indicine cattle have long been kept for meat production while in West Pokot and Pokot South sub-counties dairy breeds, primarily Ayrshire and Friesian, are increasingly kept for milk production.

Sport

Infrastructure

Energy
The Turkwel Hydro Power Plant operated by electricity generating company Kengen is situated in West Pokot County. Though the plant produces about 105MW of power which is fed to the national grid, many communities around the power plant and the extensive districts of West Pokot and Turkana do not benefit from this resource.

Notable residents
Tegla Loroupe, A world record holder for 20, 25 and 30 kilometres long distance track running
Lonah Chemtai Salpeter, Kenyan-Israeli Olympic marathon runner
Simon Kachapin, 1st and 3rd Governor of West Pokot County
John Lonyangapuo, 1st Senator and 2nd Governor of West Pokot County

2019 Landslide 
On the 23rd of November 2019 there was a landslide that has killed over 52 people. At least 22 other people are missing after this disaster, over 22,000 people have been displaced after this disaster.

References

External links
 West Pokot County
 Aridland.go.ke
 Reliefweb.int
 Map of the District

 
Counties of Kenya